The 7th annual Amnesty International UK Media Awards took place on 25 June at the Park Lane Hotel, London. The awards ceremony was hosted by Melvyn Bragg.

David Bull said at the awards;

Despite 1998 being the 50th anniversary of the Universal Declaration of Human Rights there has been no shortage of important human rights abuse stories in the last year. High-profile issues such as the massacres in Algeria and the situation in Indonesia have received significant coverage but there have also been less well-publicised abuses that still cry out for international scrutiny.

In total there were 7 awards, including the introduction of the Special Award for Human Rights Journalism Under Threat. The other award categories were National Print, Periodicals, Photojournalism, Radio, Television Documentary and Television News. For eligibility, the entries had to be published or transmitted between 16 April 1997 and 30 April 1998.

The overall winner was Robert Fisk for a series of articles on Algeria published in The Independent.

The Special Award for Human Rights Journalism Under Threat was made to Nosa Igiebor and the staff of Tell magazine, Nigeria.

The judges for all categories were Nicky Campbell, Mark Lattimer, Penny Smith, Polly Toynbee and Kirsty Young.

Shortlist and Awards 1998

See also

Notes

References

External links
 Amnesty International UK (AIUK) website
 Amnesty International UK Media Awards at the AIUK Website
 Amnesty International Website

Amnesty International
British journalism awards
Human rights awards
1998 awards in the United Kingdom
1998 in London
June 1998 events in the United Kingdom